Malaika Goel (born 23 October 1997) is an Indian shooter. She won the silver medal in the Women's 10m Air Pistol competition at the 2014 Commonwealth Games in Glasgow, Scotland. She was the youngest medallist.

Career
By the age of 20, Goel had grabbed as many as 16 international medals. She started her shooting career in 2008. In 2012, Goel won a silver medal at the senior national championships in the 10 meter Air Pistol competition. In the same year, she also won a silver at the Asian Air Gun Championships in China in the juniors category. In its 2013 event held in Tehran, Goel scoring 197.7 points won the gold medal in the Youth section.
 
In the 2014 Commonwealth Games, she won the silver medal, having scored 197.1 points. She left behind Dorothy Ludwig of Canada with Bronze medal. She also won a bronze at the Asian Championships in Kuwait in 2014. At the 59th National Shooting Championship in 2015 in New Delhi, she earned the bronze medal in the 10-metre air pistol event. Goel's coach are Mohinder Lal and Gurjeet Singh.

References

Living people
1997 births
Sportspeople from Amritsar
Indian female sport shooters
Commonwealth Games silver medallists for India
Shooters at the 2014 Asian Games
Sportswomen from Punjab, India
Commonwealth Games medallists in shooting
21st-century Indian women
21st-century Indian people
Sport shooters from Punjab, India
Shooters at the 2014 Commonwealth Games
Asian Games competitors for India
Medallists at the 2014 Commonwealth Games